NewBornTown is a Chinese mobile internet company headquartered in Beijing, China, founded by Liu Chunhe with co-founder Li Ping. It is known as the developer of Solo Launcher, Solo AppLock, and Solo Lock.

In 2020, Newborn Town put forward "Traffic+" strategy. Based on global user ecosystem, Newborn Town conntemporarily concentrates on vertical fields like game and social networking app development. By focusing on open social networking field, Newborn Town creates warm and rich social networking entertainment life for global users with multiple social networking patterns such as video, audio and game.

History 
2009

Newborn Town was founded in 2009 when the founder Liu Chunhe started his business as a mobile app developer.

2013

In May 2013, Newborn Town launched its first mobile app Solo Launcher, which served as a user interface for Android device users and was designed to provide a simpler and faster user experience with their devices.

2014

In June 2014, NewBornTown finished its angel round of funding with millions of RMB from Plum Venture and Mingming Huang.

In October 2014, Newborn Town entered the mobile advertising industry and built programmatic mobile advertising platform Solo Math from then on.

2016

In June 2016, Newborn Town launched proprietary AI engine Solo Aware.

2019

In July 2019, NewBornTown announced its intention to go public on the Hong Kong Stock Exchange in a move to raise an additional $100 million. The company managed 40 applications and claimed 670 million users in 200 countries.

On December 31, 2019, the company raised HK$175 million ($22.51 million) in an initial public offering (IPO) in Hong Kong, after its retail tranche became 1,440 times oversubscribed.

2020

In 2020, Newborn Town put forward "Traffic+" strategy and concentrated on game and social networking fields.

In June 2020, Newborn Town acquired MICO and has accumulating up to 1.13 billion users up to now.

Awards 
 2015: Best Apps of 2015,Top Developer by Google Play
 March 2016: Best Overseas Development Company by ChinaBang
 April 2016: ZhongGuanCun Star Venture Company and Most Promising Globalization Platform by GMIC together with UCWeb.
 2019: Hurun China Future Unicorns 2019 list
 2020: 50 Most Innovative Companies in China 2020 by Fast Company

See also
Solo Launcher

References 

Android (operating system)
Online companies of China
Software companies based in Beijing
Technology companies established in 2009
Companies based in Beijing
Chinese brands
Mobile software